Subida al Naranco is a professional cycle road race held in Spain in early June each year. The event was first run in 1941 but was not held consistently until 1981. Between 2005 and 2010, the race has been organised as a 1.1 event on the UCI Europe Tour. Since 2011, the race has been held as part of the Vuelta a Asturias stage race. The race ends in a climb of Monte Naranco near Oviedo

Winners

External links

UCI Europe Tour races
Cycle races in Spain
Sport in Asturias
Recurring sporting events established in 1941
1941 establishments in Spain